Richard Delamaine or Delamain, known as the elder (bef. 1629 – bef. 1645), was an English mathematician, known for works on the circular slide rule and sundials.

Life
His earliest published work Grammelogia was dedicated to Charles I. It was attacked in William Oughtred's Circles of Proportion (1631), on grounds of plagiarism: Oughtred had taught Delamaine, and considered that the work simply reproduced his mathematical instruments without any serious understanding of the theory on which they depended. Subsequently Delamaine enjoyed royal favour and the appointment of tutor to the king in mathematics, and quartermaster-general. His widow described him in those terms, in 1645, when she petitioned the House of Lords. He left ten children, one of whom bore his name, who is tentatively identified with the mathematician Richard Delamaine the younger.

Charles I, just before his death, sent to his son James, Duke of York a silver ring-sundial made on the plan here described by Delamaine.

Works
He wrote:

 Grammelogia or the Mathematicall Ring, extracted from the Logarythmes and projected Circular, 1631. The Greek title, meaning 'the speech of lines,' alludes to John Napier's Rabdologia.
The Making, Description, and Use of a small portable Instrument called a Horizontall Quadrant, 1631.

Notes

References
J F Scott, Biography in Dictionary of Scientific Biography (New York 1970-1990).
F Cajori, William Oughtred. A great Seventeenth Century Teacher of Mathematics (London-Chicago, 1916).
Richard Delamain, Dictionary of National Biography 5 (London, 1949–50), 751.
A J Turner, William Oughtred, Richard Delamain and the Horizontal Instrument in 17th-Century England, Annali dell'Istituto e Museo di Storia della Scienza di Firenze 6.2 (1981), 99-125.[Link: *http://gen.lib.rus.ec/scimag/?q=A.J.+Turner%2C+"William+Oughtred%2C ]

Attribution

External links
http://www.gap-system.org/~history/Biographies/Delamain.html

17th-century English mathematicians